Arucas is a municipality in the northern part of the island of Gran Canaria, province of Las Palmas, Canary Islands. The GC-2 motorway passes north of the town.

Sites of interest
The Church of San Juan Bautista is the leading architectural and social monument in the municipality. It was built entirely in Arucas stone by local master masons, and it dates from 1909. Apart from the wealth of the carved stone columns and column heads, there are also some beautiful stained glass windows, the works of Canary Island painter Cristobal Hernandez de Quintana, and an extraordinary carving of the Reclining Christ, by Manuel Ramos. To the north is the Montaña de Arucas which is thought to be the area where courageous Doramas the Guanche leader was killed in 1481 by Pedro de Vera in the Battle of Arucas. Arucas is known for the production of rum.

History
Arucas was rebuilt in 1480 after being completely destroyed in 1478. Since the 15th century, the main crop of the Arucas area was sugar cane.  Rum was produced here long before sugar plantations were cultivated in Cuba. One of the main features of modern-day Arucas is its rum factory. Arucas boomed with the demand for cochineal (a beetle feeding off cactus pear, crushed to produce red dye) in the second half of the 19th century.

Gallery

See also
List of municipalities in Las Palmas

References

External links

English version of Arucas tourism site

Populated places established in the 1480s
1481 establishments
15th-century establishments in Africa
Municipalities in Gran Canaria
1481 establishments in Spain